Clémence Guetté (born 15 March 1991) is a French politician from La France Insoumise. She was elected member of the National Assembly in Val-de-Marne's 2nd constituency in the 2022 French legislative election.

See also 

 List of deputies of the 16th National Assembly of France

References 

1991 births
Living people
University of Poitiers alumni
Members of Parliament for Val-de-Marne
Deputies of the 16th National Assembly of the French Fifth Republic
La France Insoumise politicians
21st-century French politicians
21st-century French women politicians
Women members of the National Assembly (France)
People from Deux-Sèvres